The 1991 Benue State gubernatorial election occurred on December 14, 1991. SDP candidate Moses Adasu won the election.

Conduct
The gubernatorial election was conducted using an open ballot system. Primaries for the two parties to select their flag bearers were conducted on October 19, 1991.

The election occurred on December 14, 1991. SDP candidate Moses Adasu won the election.

References 

Benue State gubernatorial elections
Benue State gubernatorial election
Benue State gubernatorial election